This is a list of Scheduled castes in India.  The Indian constitution, in Constitution (Scheduled Castes) Order, 1950 lists 1,109 castes across 28 states in its First Schedule, while the Constitution (Scheduled Tribes) Order, 1950 lists 744 tribes across 22 states in its First Schedule.

The scheduled castes include:

See also
List of Scheduled Castes in Delhi
Dalit
List of Scheduled Castes in Gujarat
List of Scheduled Castes in Jammu and Kashmir
List of Scheduled castes in Rajasthan
Distribution of Scheduled Castes by District in Uttar Pradesh
List of Scheduled Castes in Uttar Pradesh

Uttar Pradesh 
 Caste	Population 2011	Percentage among total S.C population
Badhik	9,018	0.01%
Badi	11,721	0.03%
Baheliya	143,442	0.6%
Baiga (excluding Sonbhadra district)	26,476	0.08%
Baiswar	30,000	0.09%
Bajaniya	1,769	0.005%
Bajgi	640	0.002%
Balahar	7,910	0.02%
Balai	1,014	0.002%
Balmiki	11,66,383	1.3%
Bangali	18,660	0.05%
Bansphor	57,025	0.2%
Barwar	13,326	0.04%
Basor	137,013	0.4%
Bawariya	6,054	0.02%
Beldar	158,727	0.5%
Beriya	27,187	0.08%
Bhantu	8,184	0.02%
Bhuiya	18,055	0.05%
Bhuiyar	24,982	0.07%
Chamar, Jatav, Ahirwar, Kureel, Dhusia, Ramdasia, Ravidassia, Satnami	22,496,047	54.3%
Chero (excluding Sonbhadra & Varanasi districts)	32,405	0.1%
Dabgar	3,638	0.01%
Dhangar (not to be confused with Dhangar caste of same name)	43,806	0.1%
Dhanuk	542,651	1.5%
Dharkar	94,610	0.3%
Dhobi, Kanaoujiya, Diwakar, Baretha	2,684,212	16.01%
Dom	110,353	0.3%
Domar	24,581	0.07%
Dusadh	237,181	0.7%
Gharami	184	0.0005%
Ghasiya	3,984	0.011%
Gond (excluding Maharajganj, Siddharth Nagar, Basti, Gorakhpur, Deoria, Azamgarh, Mau, Jaunpur, Ballia, Ghazipur, Varanasi, Mirzapur and Sonbhadra)	443,457	1.3%
Gual	7,330	0.02%
Habura	4,863	0.014%
Hari	1,719	0.005%
Hela	40,678	0.12%
Kalabaz	8,727	0.025%
Kanjar	93,207	0.3%
Kapariya	14,300	0.04%
Kharwar	7,183	0.020%
Khairaha	3,047	0.008%
Kharwar (excluding Benbansi) (excluding districts of Ballia, Ghazipur, Deoria, Varanasi and Sonbhadra)	119,248	0.3%
Khatik	164,765	1.2%
Khorot	700	0.002%
Kol	331,374	4.5%
Kori	22,93,937	12.07%
Korwa	1,594	0.005%
Lalbegi	299	0.0009%
Majhwar	18,268	0.05%
Mazhabi	3,664	0.01%
Musahar	206,594	0.6%
Nat	158,379	0.5%
Pankha (excluding Mirzapur and Sonbhadra)	20,354	0.06%
Parahiya (excluding Sonbhadra)	1,816	0.005%
Pasi, Rawat, Rajpasi, Baurasi, Kaithwas, Gujjar, Paswan, Tarmali	55,97,002	16.0%
Patari (excluding Sonbhadra)	1,716	0.005%
Saharya excluding Lalitpur	60,238	0.2%
Sanaurhiya	1,066	0.003%
Sansiya	8,639	0.02%
Shilpkar	24,757	0.07%
Turahiya	28,055	0.08 etc.

Scheduled Castes
Scheduled Castes

Scheduled Castes